The Alexandria Police Department (APD) is the primary law enforcement agency servicing 155,810 people within  of jurisdiction within Alexandria, Virginia. The APD has been internationally accredited by the Commission on Accreditation for Law Enforcement Agencies (CALEA) since 1986, and was re-accredited in 1991, 1996, 2001, 2004, 2007, 2010, 2013, and 2016. The APD has 315 sworn officers and 152 civilian employees. New officers are trained at the Northern Virginia Criminal Justice Training Academy.

Jurisdiction 
City of Alexandria police officers have jurisdiction of Virginian crimes and crimes legislated by the City of Alexandria local government. Physical jurisdiction extends 1 mile into neighboring jurisdictions of Arlington County and Fairfax County.

History

Night watchmen and constables were employed by the city since 1797 with the starting pay of $150 dollars annually.

The Alexandria Police Department was founded on July 15, 1870. When the city authorized a formal police department, the board of police elected a captain, a lieutenant, and 19 patrolmen. All officers were issued star-shaped tin badges, but they had to supply their own uniforms and guns.

In 1918, the Alexandria Police Department founded the Motor Unit with the purchase of one Harley-Davidson motorcycle for use in answering emergency calls.

On September 11, 2001 the Alexandria Police Department responded to the Pentagon in response to the  September 11 attacks as mutual aid to support the Arlington County Police Department, the jurisdiction in which the attacks occurred.

In 2009, then Deputy Chief Earl L. Cook became the first African-American Chief of Police in Alexandria replacing Chief David P. Baker.

In November, 2011, construction was completed on their current headquarters in the West End section of Alexandria, on Wheeler Avenue immediately south of Duke Street. 

On October 1, 2016 Chief Earl Cook retired after 37 years and Deputy Chief David Huchler was appointed Interim Chief of Police while the IACP searched for a replacement. On January 16 Michael L. Brown, former Chief of Police for the California Highway Patrol was announced as the successor to Earl Cook.

The department responded to shots fired on June 14, 2017 to a quiet Del Ray neighborhood. Officers from both Alexandria and the United States Capitol Police shot and killed James Hodgkinson after a 10-minute gun battle with the assailant, an event that became known as the Congressional baseball shooting. Hodgkinson was attempting to kill Republican congressmen who were practicing on the Monroe Street baseball field for the annual Congressional Baseball Game for Charity. Three officers from the Alexandria Police Department received the Public Safety Officer Medal of Valor on July 27, 2017, in recognition of their heroism during the shooting. The Medal of Valor is the highest decoration for bravery exhibited by public safety officers in the United States.

In June, 2021, Chief Michael Brown retired and Asst. Chief Don Hayes was named Acting Chief. Acting Chief Don Hayes was appointed Chief in April, 2022.

In December, 2021, the police department reported having trouble hiring and retaining staff and officers due to pay being not competitive with other nearby police agencies.

Organization

Field Operations Bureau
The Field Operations Bureau is responsible for patrolling neighborhoods and responding to 9-1-1 calls. They also provide traffic enforcement and conduct preliminary investigations of crimes.

Patrol Sectors:
Patrol Sector 1 - Old Town
Patrol Sector 2 - Del Ray/Arlandria
Patrol Sector 3 - West End
Patrol Support
Community Oriented Policing Section (COPS)
Special Operations Team (SOT)
K-9
Motors
School Resource Officers (SRO)
Parking Enforcement
School Crossing Guards
Hack Inspector
 Office of Homeland Security and Operational Preparedness (HS/OP)
HS/OP is responsible for the traditional Homeland Security functions to include: maintaining a liaison with federal, state, local and military terrorism/intelligence counterparts; partnership in the Federal Bureau of Investigation's Joint Terrorism Task Force, and review and local follow-up investigations of related police reports and bulletins regarding international or domestic terrorism matters.

Investigative Services Bureau
The Investigations Bureau investigates major crimes, including allegations of police misconduct. The bureau has 91 employees and 65 to 80 volunteers.

Sections:
Criminal Investigation Section
Crime Scene Investigation Section
Vice Narcotics Section
Media Services Unit
Internal Investigations

Administrative Services Bureau
The Administrative Services Bureau includes the following division and units:
Technology, Data and Analysis Division
Crime Analysis Unit
Personnel and Training
Facilities Management

Rank structure, insignia and uniform

These are the current ranks of the Alexandria Police Department:

Recruit officer is the initial rank of oncoming Alexandria Police Officer, held while undergoing training at the Northern Virginia Criminal Justice Training Academy. Upon graduation from the academy Recruit officers are appointed to the rank of Police Officer and enter the Police Training Officer Program.

APD adopts a rank differentiation method via the uniforms worn. Police Officer 1 up through the rank of Police Officer 4 wear gray shirts and silver badges with 'A.P.D.' insignia pinned on each side of the collar and silver cap plates. Sergeants also wear the same gray shirt but they wear gold badges, gold collar insignia, and gold cap plates instead of silver.

Higher-ranking officers (Lieutenant and above) wear white shirts with gold badges with gold 'A.P.D.' insignia pinned on each side of the collar. Their insignia of rank is displayed on the shoulder epaulettes of the uniform (as in the military). The badges and cap plates for higher-ranking officers are gold and engraved with the wearers rank-title.

Fallen officers
Since the establishment of the Alexandria Police Department, 17 officers have died in the line of duty. Charles and Clarence McClary were brothers.

See also

 List of law enforcement agencies in Virginia

References

External links

The Alexandria Police Foundation
Northern Virginia Criminal Justice Training Academy

Government of Alexandria, Virginia
Municipal police departments of Virginia
1870 establishments in Virginia
Government agencies established in 1870